Miriam Kara (מרים קארה; born December 3, 1938) is an Israeli former Olympic gymnast.

She was born in Jerusalem and is Jewish.

Gymnastics career
Kara competed for Israel at the 1960 Summer Olympics in Rome, Italy, in gymnastics at the age of 21. In the Women's Individual All-Around she came in tied for 86th out of 124 gymnasts, in the Women's Floor Exercise she came in 83rd, in the Women's Horse Vault she came in 108th, in the Women's Uneven Bars she came in 68th, and in the Women's Balance Beam she came in 84th.

At the 1962 World Artistic Gymnastics Championships Kara came in 83rd overall as the Israeli team came in 15th overall, and at the 1966 World Artistic Gymnastics Championships she came in 103rd as the Israeli team came in 16th.

References

External links
 

Israeli female artistic gymnasts
Living people
Olympic gymnasts of Israel
Gymnasts at the 1960 Summer Olympics
1938 births
Jewish gymnasts
People from Jerusalem